Cook Inlet ( Sugpiaq: Cungaaciq) stretches  from the Gulf of Alaska to Anchorage in south-central Alaska. Cook Inlet branches into the Knik Arm and Turnagain Arm at its northern end, almost surrounding Anchorage.  On its southern end, it merges with Shelikof Strait, Stevenson Entrance, Kennedy Entrance and Chugach Passage.

The Cook Inlet watershed is the most populated watershed in Alaska. The watershed includes the drainage areas of Denali (formerly named Mount McKinley). Within the watershed there are several national parks and the active volcano Mount Redoubt, along with three other historically active volcanoes. Cook Inlet provides navigable access to the port of Anchorage at the northern end, and to the smaller Homer port further south. Before the growth of Anchorage, Knik was the destination for most marine traffic in upper Cook Inlet. Approximately 400,000 people live within the Cook Inlet watershed.

Geography

The Cook Inlet region contains active volcanoes, including Augustine Volcano and Mount Redoubt. Volcanic eruptions in the region have been associated with earthquakes and tsunamis, and debris avalanches have resulted in tsunamis also. There was an earthquake of the magnitude of 7.1 on December 31, 1901 generated by an eruption that caused several tsunamis. In 2009 a lahar from Mt. Redoubt threatened the Drift River oil terminal.

History

The inlet was first explored and settled by Dena'ina people. In the 18th century, Russian fur hunters (promyshlenniki) were among the first European visitors. The Lebedev Lastochkin Company leader Stepan Zaikov established a post at the mouth of the Kenai River, Fort Nikolaev, in 1786.  These fur trappers used Siberian Native and Alaska Native people, particularly Aleuts from the Aleutian Islands and Koniag natives from Kodiak, to hunt for sea otters and other marine mammal species for trade with China via Russia's then-exclusive inland port of trade at Kiakhta.

Other Europeans to visit Cook Inlet include the 1778 expedition of James Cook, its namesake, who sailed into it while searching for the Northwest Passage.  Cook received maps of Alaska, the Aleutians, and Kamchatka during a visit with Russian fur trader Gerasim Izmailov in Unalaska, and combined these maps with those of his expedition to create the first Mercator projection of the North Pacific.  The inlet was named after Cook in 1794 by George Vancouver, who had served under Cook in 1778. Turnagain Arm was named by William Bligh of HMS Bounty fame.  Bligh served as Cook's Sailing Master on his 3rd and final voyage, the aim of which was discovery of the Northwest Passage.

Upon reaching the head of Cook Inlet, Bligh was of the opinion that both Knik Arm and Turnagain Arm were the mouths of rivers and not the opening to the Northwest Passage.  Under Cook's orders Bligh organized a party to travel up Knik Arm, which quickly returned to report Knik Arm indeed led only to a river.

Afterwards a second party was dispatched up Turnagain Arm and it too returned to report only a river lay ahead.  As a result of this frustration the second body of water was given the disingenuous name "Turn Again". Early maps label Turnagain Arm as the "Turnagain River".

The S.S. Farallon was a wooden Alaskan Steamship Company liner that struck Black Reef in the Cook Inlet on January 5, 1910. All thirty-eight men on board survived, and were rescued twenty-nine days later. Few white people visited upper Cook Inlet until construction of the Alaska Railroad along the eastern shores of Turnagain Arm and Knik Arm of Cook Inlet around 1915. The natives of the Eklutna village are the descendants of the residents of eight native villages around upper Cook Inlet.

Both hamlets were destroyed. Girdwood was later relocated inland and Portage was abandoned. About  of the Seward Highway sank below the high-water mark of Turnagain Arm; the highway and its bridges were raised and rebuilt in 1964–66.

Communities
Most of Alaska's population is in the Cook Inlet area, with highest concentration in Anchorage. Along the East side of the Cook Inlet, the Kenai Peninsula is host to many smaller fishing communities, such as Kenai, Soldotna, Ninilchick, Anchor Point and Homer.  Many residents of the Kenai rely on income generated from fisheries in the Cook Inlet. The west side of the Inlet is not connected to any major road systems and is typically accessed by boat or plane. Here you can find the village of Tyonek, Alaska, some oil camps, and many seasonal fishing camps.

Resources

The Cook Inlet Basin contains large oil and gas deposits including several offshore fields.    As of 2005 there were 16 platforms in Cook Inlet, the oldest of which is the XTO A platform first installed by Shell in 1964, and newest of which is the Osprey platform installed by Forest Oil in 2000.  Most of the platforms are operated by Union Oil, which was acquired by Chevron in 2005. There are also numerous oil and gas pipelines running around and under the Cook Inlet.  The main destinations of the gas pipelines are to Kenai where the gas is primarily used to fuel commercial fertilizer production and a liquified natural gas (LNG) plant and to Anchorage where the gas is consumed largely for domestic uses.

Alaska has approximately half the known coal reserves in the U.S. For decades, there has been a proposal to build a large coal mine (the Chuitna Coal Mine) on the west side of Cook Inlet near the Chuitna River, and the native village of Tyonek, Alaska. American Rivers has placed the Chuitna River on its list of the 10 most endangered rivers for 2007, based on the threat of this mine.

Turnagain Arm is one of only about 60 bodies of water worldwide to exhibit a tidal bore. The bore may be more than six feet high and travel at 15 miles per hour on high spring tides and opposing winds. Turnagain Arm sees the largest tidal range in United States, with a mean of 30 feet (9.2 m), and the fourth highest in the world, behind Bay of Fundy (11.7m), Ungava Bay (9.75m), and Bristol Channel (9.6m). The ocean's natural 12-hour 25-minute tidal cycle is close to Turnagain Arm's natural resonance frequency, which then reinforces the tide similar to water sloshing in a bathtub. The inlet and its arms have been proposed as a potentially attractive site for the generation of tidal power.

Turnagain Arm and Knik Arm are known for large areas of silt. At low tide, much of this is exposed, making marine navigation difficult. Historically, ships and boats designed for the area had a relatively flat bottom with a modest centerboard and absence of a large keel because the boats would occasionally become beached at low tide either on purpose or by accident.  This design allowed the craft to support its weight on land without sustaining any serious damage to its structure.  An example of this design is the Nomad, a much photographed fishing boat once owned by Joe Reddington which has sat on a mudflat near Knik for several decades.

These mudflats can also be dangerous to walk on, exhibiting quicksand-like characteristics, and have claimed the life of at least two people who have wandered out on them.

Cruise ships dock at Seward on the Gulf of Alaska or Whittier in Prince William Sound and transport passengers via bus or train to Anchorage. However, over 95% of freight entering Alaska comes through the Port of Anchorage, which is served by major container ship companies and other carriers.

Conservation

The Cook Inlet beluga whale is a genetically distinct and geographically isolated stock. The population fell to 278 in 2005 and it is listed as critically endangered in the IUCN Red List of Threatened Species. This was perhaps due to local hunt, although a recent article in the Anchorage Daily News questioned this conclusion.

In 2000, the US National Marine Fisheries Service listed the Cook Inlet beluga whale population as depleted and began development of a conservation plan. On October 22, 2008 the Cook Inlet beluga whale was put onto the endangered species list.

Cook Inlet activities include commercial fishing, oil and gas development, release of treated sewage, noise from aircraft and ships, shipping traffic, and tourism. However, it is not known what impact these activities had on the beluga whale population.

The Coastal Marine Institute at the University of Alaska Fairbanks's School of Fisheries and Ocean Sciences working with the U.S. Department of the Interior's Minerals Management Service (MMS), began a three-year project in 2003 focusing on the water circulation in Cook Inlet.

Cook Inletkeeper, a member of the Waterkeeper Alliance, began in 1994 when a group of Alaskans became concerned about the rapid ecological changes in the inlet. The group formally incorporated the following year using settlement proceeds from a Clean Water Act lawsuit against Cook Inlet oil and gas producers. Their stated mission is to "protect Alaska's Cook Inlet watershed and the life it sustains," with a focus on clean water, healthy habitat, local economies, and energy. They are based in Homer.

See also

Alaska Wildlife Conservation Center
Augustine Volcano
Kalgin Island
Knik Arm Bridge
Lake Clark National Park
Captain Cook State Recreation Area

Notes

External links
 United States, Alaska South Coast, Barren Islands National Ocean Service
 United States, Alaska South Coast, Cook Inlet, Anchor Point to Kalgin Island National Ocean Service
 Map of Cook Inlet oil and gas activity Alaska Department of Natural Resources

Estuaries of Alaska
Bodies of water of Anchorage, Alaska
Bodies of water of Kenai Peninsula Borough, Alaska
Bodies of water of Matanuska-Susitna Borough, Alaska
Kenai Mountains-Turnagain Arm National Heritage Area
Monuments and memorials to James Cook